The Starlit Corridor is a 1967 science fiction anthology edited by Roger Mansfield. It was published by Pergamon Press.

Contents
 Space: Third Millennium, poem by Denis Pethebridge
 Before Eden (1961), short story by Arthur C. Clarke
 Return of the Moon Man (1955), short story by Eric Malpass
 The Space Pilot, poem by J. Blackie 
 Space Probe to Venus, poem by Constantine FitzGibbon
 Disappearing Act (1953), short story by Alfred Bester  (first published in Star 1953)
 To See the Rabbit, poem by Alan Brownjohn
 Pawley's Peepholes (1951), short story by John Wyndham
 Tea in a Space-Ship, poem by James Kirkup
 The Monsters (1953), short story by Robert Sheckley
 Harrison Bergeron (1961), short story by Kurt Vonnegut, Jr.
 The Happy Man (1963), novelette by Gerald W. Page
 Bedtime Story (1963), poem by George MacBeth
 The Liberation of Earth (1953), short story by William Tenn
 Science Fiction (1960), poem by Kingsley Amis

External links

1967 anthologies
Science fiction anthologies
Pergamon Press books